Viktor Savvich Klimenko (born 24 November 1942) is a singer who made himself known as the "Singing Cossack".

Biography
Klimenko was born in Karelia, to a Russian Kuban Cossack father, Savva Klimenko, and a Russian mother, Olga Glotova. A few years after his birth, his family moved to Finland. There, he became a musician and appeared in several films, mostly appearing as himself. The Eurovision Song Contest 1965 was his first appearance outside of Finland; his song didn't earn any points in the competition.

In 1970, Klimenko released the album Stenka Rasin across Europe.  The album, containing Russian songs, went gold in the Finnish market—the first record to do so in Finland. Later, it was certified platinum. This success was followed by a decade of concerts around the world. Klimeno had nine more gold records and one more platinum record.

In 1973, he played in the Norwegian "comedy-humour-musical" Kofferten (Swedish: Ryck mig i vaskan), a co-operation between Sveriges Radio, BBC, YLE, and NRK.

Klimenko rebranded himself as a Gospel singer in 1980, after having a personal religious revelation.

Selected filmography 
 Vodkaa, komisario Palmu (1969)
 Sauna (2008)

References

External links

Official website (English version)

1942 births
Living people
20th-century Finnish male singers
Eurovision Song Contest entrants for Finland
Eurovision Song Contest entrants of 1965
Finnish people of Russian descent
Finnish people of Ukrainian descent
Russian-speaking Finns
People of Cossack descent